Marceline is a city in Chariton and Linn counties in the U.S. state of Missouri. The population was 2,123 at the 2020 census.

History
Marceline was laid out in 1887, and named after the wife of a railroad man. A post office called Marceline has been in operation since 1887. Marceline is most famous for being the boyhood home of Walt Disney, and the original Main Street USA.

Geography
Marceline is located at  (39.714314, -92.947376).

Climate

Demographics

2010 census
At the 2010 census there were 2,233 people, 970 households, and 606 families living in the city. The racial makeup of the city was 98.0% White, 0.3% African American, 0.1% Native American, 0.1% Asian, 0.2% from other races, and 1.3% from two or more races. Hispanic or Latino of any race were 1.4%.

Of the 970 households 30.5% had children under the age of 18 living with them, 48.4% were married couples living together, 9.4% had a female householder with no husband present, 4.7% had a male householder with no wife present, and 37.5% were non-families. 34.0% of households were one person and 16.8% were one person aged 65 or older. The average household size was 2.30 and the average family size was 2.94.

The median age was 39.8 years. 25.1% of residents were under the age of 18; 7.7% were between the ages of 18 and 24; 22.8% were from 25 to 44; 26% were from 45 to 64; and 18.3% were 65 or older. The gender makeup of the city was 46.6% male and 53.4% female.

2000 census
At the 2000 census there were 2,558 people, 1,079 households, and 690 families living in the city. The population density was 787.1 people per square mile (303.9/km). There were 1,237 housing units at an average density of 380.6/sq mi (147.0/km).  The racial makeup of the city was 98.20% White, 0.12% African American, 0.78% Native American, 0.20% Asian, 0.20% from other races, and 0.51% from two or more races. Hispanic or Latino of any race were 0.82%.

Of the 1,079 households 31.0% had children under the age of 18 living with them, 48.8% were married couples living together, 11.4% had a female householder with no husband present, and 36.0% were non-families. 32.4% of households were one person and 17.6% were one person aged 65 or older. The average household size was 2.32 and the average family size was 2.95.

The age distribution was 26.7% under the age of 18, 7.6% from 18 to 24, 24.4% from 25 to 44, 21.7% from 45 to 64, and 19.6% 65 or older. The median age was 39 years. For every 100 females, there were 84.7 males. For every 100 females age 18 and over, there were 78.2 males.

The median household income was $25,164 and the median family income  was $35,948. Males had a median income of $26,786 versus $17,382 for females. The per capita income for the city was $15,086. About 9.0% of families and 13.1% of the population were below the poverty line, including 15.3% of those under age 18 and 19.5% of those age 65 or over.

Education
Public education in Marceline is administered by the Marceline R-V School District.

Marceline has a public library, the Marceline Carnegie Library.

Notable people
Walt Disney, animator and founder of The Walt Disney Company, spent four years of his childhood on a farm near Marceline. The family moved to Kansas City, Missouri where he founded the animation studio Laugh-O-Gram Studio. Main Street, U.S.A., a land found in Disneyland as well as in other Disney theme parks worldwide, was inspired by Disney's childhood growing up in Marceline. The Walt Disney Hometown Museum is located in the former Santa Fe rail depot in Marceline.

References

Further reading

External links

 Official website
 Historic maps of Marceline in the Sanborn Maps of Missouri Collection at the University of Missouri

Cities in Chariton County, Missouri
Cities in Linn County, Missouri
Populated places established in 1887
1887 establishments in Missouri
Cities in Missouri